The Fiddlin' Buckaroo is a 1933 American Western film directed by Ken Maynard and written by Nate Gatzert. The film stars Ken Maynard, Gloria Shea, Fred Kohler, Frank Rice, Jack Rockwell and Joseph W. Girard. The film was released on July 20, 1933, by Universal Pictures.

Cast 
Ken Maynard as Fiddlin'
Gloria Shea as Ann Kerriman
Fred Kohler as Wolf Morgan
Frank Rice as Banty
Jack Rockwell as Sheriff
Joseph W. Girard as Kerriman 
Billy Franey as Postmaster Dan 
Slim Whitaker as Henchman Swede 
Jack Mower as Ranch hand Buck
Robert McKenzie as Jerry 
Tarzan as Tarzan

References

External links 
 

1933 films
American Western (genre) films
1933 Western (genre) films
Universal Pictures films
American black-and-white films
1930s English-language films
1930s American films